Christchurch was a railway station in Christchurch in the county of Hampshire (now Dorset). It was opened on 13 November 1862 by the Ringwood, Christchurch and Bournemouth Railway. Becoming part of the London and South Western Railway, it was closed on 30 May 1886, and replaced by the current Christchurch railway station located to the west of the newly created junction with the rail route to Hinton Admiral, New Milton, Sway and Brockenhurst. In 1935 the line from Christchurch to Ringwood was closed.

The site today
Having closed to passengers the buildings remained open as a freight depot and sidings were used for the storage of wagons until about 1960. The site is now an industrial estate.

References

Further reading
 
 

Disused railway stations in Christchurch, Dorset
Former London and South Western Railway stations
Railway stations in Great Britain opened in 1862
Railway stations in Great Britain closed in 1886
History of Christchurch, Dorset
1862 establishments in England